Richard Aimonetto (born 24 January 1973) is a French ice hockey centre currently playing for Yétis du Mont-Blanc of the FFHG Division 1. 

Aimonetto previously played in the Ligue Magnus for Chamonix HC, Brûleurs de Loups, Lions de Lyons, Hockey Club de Reims, Scorpions de Mulhouse and Gothiques d'Amiens. He competed in the 1998 and 2002 Winter Olympics.

References

External links

1973 births
Living people
Brûleurs de Loups players
Chamonix HC players
French ice hockey centres
Gothiques d'Amiens players
Hockey Club de Reims players
Ice hockey players at the 1998 Winter Olympics
Ice hockey players at the 2002 Winter Olympics
LHC Les Lions players
Olympic ice hockey players of France
People from Chamonix
Sportspeople from Haute-Savoie
French expatriate sportspeople in Canada
French expatriate ice hockey people
Saint-Jean Lynx players
Scorpions de Mulhouse players
Shawinigan Cataractes players
Victoriaville Tigres players